Brindley is a civil parish in Cheshire East, England.  It contains three buildings that are recorded in the National Heritage List for England as designated listed buildings, all of which are at Grade II.  This grade is the lowest of the three gradings given to listed buildings and is applied to "buildings of national importance and special interest".  The parish is almost entirely rural, and the listed buildings consist of two cottages and a farmhouse.

See also
Listed buildings in Spurstow
Listed buildings in Haughton
Listed buildings in Hurleston
Listed buildings in Burland
Listed buildings in Faddiley

References

Listed buildings in the Borough of Cheshire East
Lists of listed buildings in Cheshire